The Reading University Head of the River Race is a rowing race held annually on the River Thames in Reading, England.

The race has been run since 1935, making it the fourth oldest head of the river race. It is organised by the boat club of the University of Reading. Competitors include boats from universities and schools.

References

Rowing on the River Thames
Recurring sporting events established in 1935
Sport in Reading, Berkshire
1935 establishments in England